Churchill: The Hollywood Years is a 2004 British comedy film directed by Peter Richardson, who also wrote the screenplay with Pete Richens. The film stars Christian Slater as Winston Churchill, and Neve Campbell as Elizabeth II. Miranda Richardson and Antony Sher also co-star.

The film is a satire on the Hollywood take on history, such as U-571 (portraying the capture of an Enigma machine as being by the Americans rather than the British) and Pearl Harbor (where American participation in the Battle of Britain was exaggerated).

Plot
In this parody, the British court and war government consist mainly of idiots and traitors. Adolf Hitler moves into Buckingham Palace and plans to marry into the Windsors. A U.S. Army officer claims the iconic cigar-smoking PM was an actor named Roy Bubbles; however, he was actually USMC lieutenant Winston Churchill who had stolen an Enigma code machine and then almost single-handedly won a very alternative battle for Britain.

Production
It was filmed between 24 March and 12 May 2003.
Mainly filmed at the Royal William Yard, Stonehouse, Plymouth

 Oldway Mansion doubles as Buckingham Palace
 Powderham Castle, Exeter
 The old fish quay at Brixham, Devon doubles as Plymouth Docks

Cultural references
 The scene between Charoo and the waitress in a station tearoom, and Elizabeth's response on Churchill's arrival there, are parodies of scenes from Brief Encounter, between Stanley Holloway and Joyce Carey, and Trevor Howard and Celia Johnson, respectively
 The taxi driver and the King mistake Adolf Hitler for Charlie Chaplin, who played a spoof of Hitler in the satirical film The Great Dictator
 The "Siegfried Line" rap takes its title and (loosely) some of its lyrics from the British wartime song "We're Going to Hang out the Washing on the Siegfried Line". The introduction to the song is a reference to Top Gun.
 The song "Hitler Has Only Got One Ball" is frequently referenced, including once where it is delivered by Tommy Trinder
 The presence of "Irish Cockneys" is a reference to the steerage passengers in Titanic
 Churchill's final exit in a Spitfire references the portrayal of the American contribution to the Battle of Britain early in the film Pearl Harbor
 Brian Perkins' commentary on Hitler and Elizabeth's wedding is a parody of Richard Dimbleby's hushed radio commentaries of royal events
 Eva Braun is shown listening to the end of an episode of The Archers, even though it did not start until six years after the war ended
 Jim Jim Charoo takes his name from a song Dick van Dyke sings in Mary Poppins (he also lives on "Ye Olde Dick Van Dyke Street")

Cast

Historical characters
 Christian Slater as Winston Churchill
 Neve Campbell as Princess Elizabeth
 Miranda Richardson as Eva Braun
 Antony Sher as Adolf Hitler
 Harry Enfield as King George VI
 Jessica Oyelowo as Princess Margaret
 Henry Goodman as Franklin D. Roosevelt
 Jon Culshaw as Tony Blair
 Romany Malco as Denzil Eisenhower
 David Schneider as Joseph Goebbels
 Phil Cornwell as Martin Bormann
 Steve O'Donnell as Hermann Göring
 John Fabian as Victor Sylvester

Other
 Rik Mayall as Baxter
 Bob Mortimer as Potter
 Vic Reeves as Bendle
 Ashleigh Caldwell as Bette
 Sally Phillips as Waitress
 Steve Pemberton as Chester
 Hamish McColl as Captain Davies (present-day)
 Leslie Phillips as Lord W'ruff
 Mackenzie Crook as Jim Charoo
 Brian Perkins as Radio Presenter
 James Dreyfus as Mr. Teasy-Weasy

Reception
Philip French writing in The Observer called the film "a hit and miss affair". Peter Bradshaw in The Guardian gave it three stars and said "It's wildly uneven and very broad, but there are some laughs in Peter Richardson's Comic Strip fantasy of Churchill's real life as a kickass action hero". However, Nev Peirce on the BBC's website panned the film, saying "Sadly, Peter Richardson suffers the fate of many satirists; in trying to mock bad movies, he's simply made a bad movie". The film holds a score of 40% on the review aggregate site Rotten Tomatoes.

The film grossed $288,292 on its opening weekend across 170 screens in the UK. It grossed a total of $478,981 in the United Kingdom.

References

External links
 Peter Richardson TV
 
 

2004 films
2004 comedy films
British comedy films
British satirical films
The Comic Strip
Cultural depictions of Adolf Hitler
Cultural depictions of Eva Braun
Cultural depictions of Joseph Goebbels
Cultural depictions of Hermann Göring
Cultural depictions of George VI
Cultural depictions of Tony Blair
Cultural depictions of Franklin D. Roosevelt
Films about Winston Churchill
Films scored by Simon Boswell
Films set in England
British World War II films
2000s English-language films
Films directed by Peter Richardson (British director)
2000s British films